= Asics Gel-NYC =

Line of lifestyle shoes by Asics

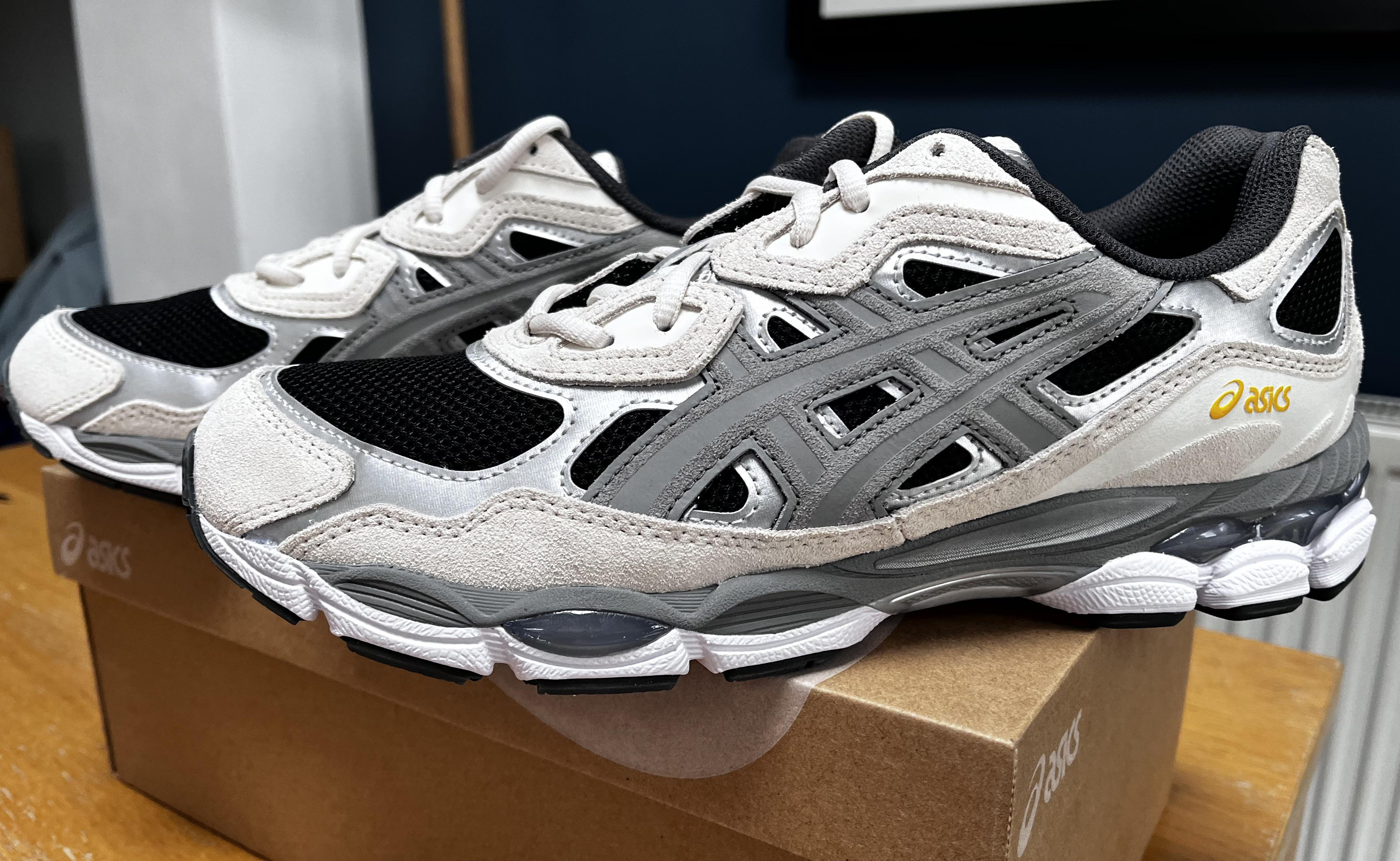
- Type: Sneakers
- Inventor: Asics
- Inception: 2023; 3 years ago
- Available: Yes

Asics Gel-NYC is a shoe released by Asics. The shoe was created in the style of 2000s era running shoes and their mesh upper design.

== Overview ==
The shoe was inspired by the popular trend of the early 2020s with 2000s era running shoes becoming popular among consumers. Asics already brought back retros of their old shoes from that era and had plans to release more. Despite this, the company wanted to do something different and planned to release a completely new model that took inspiration from the mesh running shoes of the 2000s.

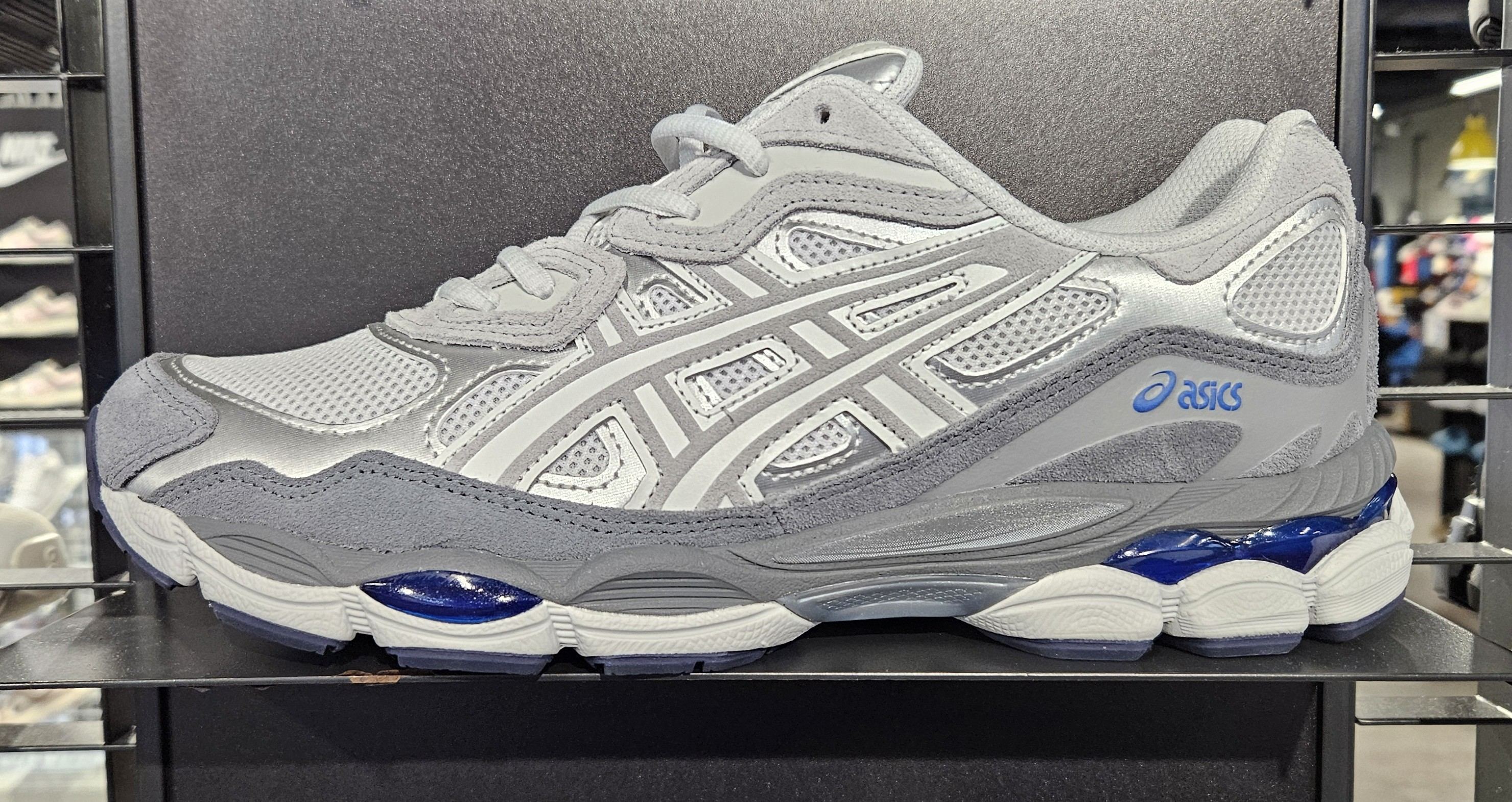
A Glacier Grey/Gravel pair of Asics Gel-NYC.

The designers took inspiration from New York City and wanted to create a new shoe that would represent it and so the shoe was called the Gel-NYC. The company took the upper of the Gel-Nimbus 3 and combined some elements from the Gel-MC Plus V into the design. The bottom of the shoe was taken from the Gel-Cumulus 16. This model also used suede for the upper which was not part of its other retro releases since the material did not help in making a good running shoe. In order to make the connection to New York stronger, the first release of the shoe was made in collaboration with "Awake NY" and was released in January 2023. A general release followed in March 2023.

== Popularity ==
Despite being a new model, the shoe quickly went on to become a popular shoe thanks to its retro design and soon even became Asics' second best selling shoe for the whole company the months following its release. The demand would lead to more collaborations in the future with the most notable being with another New York based company, "Hidden NY" in 2024.

== Models ==
=== Gel-NYC 2055 ===
The shoe uses the same bottom from the Gel-Cumulus 16 but the upper uses a different design that is a combination of the GT-2050 and GT-2060, hence the name Gel-NYC 2055.

=== Gel-NYC RGD ===
A more rugged version of the shoe. The Gel-NYC RGD features smooth synthetic leather instead of the suede overlays, different mesh material, and heel tabs. It was released in September 2025.

=== Gel-NYC 2.0 ===
An updated version of the shoe released in 2026. The upper of the shoe is designed after the Gel-1050 which released in 2000. It features some suede overlays on the upper for an updated look. The bottom of the shoe is a mixture of the Gel-1050 and Gel-Lyte DS II with a tooling that includes the company's Trusstic units, Gel technology, and FF Blast Plus foam. The shoe debuted the same way as many of the company's other shoes with a special collaboration edition releasing first, followed by a general release. Asics partnered with Hal Studios to release two special pairs based on the design of New York City. The shoes were released in two colorways inspired by the rapper Nas and rap group Wu-Tang Clan. The special collaboration was released on January 16, 2026. This was followed by a general release with two colorways on February 5, 2026.
